The Nigerian College of Aviation Technology is a higher education institute in Zaria, Kaduna State, Nigeria. It is funded by the Civil Aviation Department in the Nigerian Federal Ministry of Aviation.

Formerly known as the Nigerian Civil Aviation Training Centre, the school was established in 1964.

History 
The Nigeria College of Aviation Technology was formally inaugurated in 1964 through an Act of Parliament. It began operations in 1966 with technical support from the United Nations Development Programme and the International Civil Aviation Organization.  It was designed to be a training center for Nigerian and African pilots, aircraft maintenance engineers, navigation aid technicians and it subsequently created a flying school, air traffic services and communications school and aeronautical electronics and telecommunications school to meet its objectives. In the late 1970s, it began giving specialized training courses in instrument landing systems, jet simulation, airline transport, and VHF omnidirectional range. In 1977, it admitted its first female student.

Library 
The Nigerian College of Aviation Technology library is an academic Library that was established in 1964 to support teaching and instructional programmes of the college. As an important educational agency for the intellectual and information needs of students, technical and administrative staff and facilitates research in aviation industry. the virtual Library make digitized information resources available online or offline to both academic staff, non -academic staff, students and other researchers without moving from offices.

Operations 
It has a fleet of about 26 training aircraft. These consist of 14 single-engine TAMPICO TB9, 5 single TRINIDAD TB20, 3 twin-engine Beech 58, 2 BELL 206 Helicopters, a B737 aircraft for cabin crew training and 1 TBM 850 aircraft for flight training. As of 2010, about 6,500 students had graduated from the college, which offers course in flying, aircraft maintenance, air traffic control and aeronautical telecommunications.
Chief Dayo Abatan was appointed chairman of the college in February 2009.

In 2010, the college was seeking to become a degree-awarding institution through affiliation with a foreign university.

A Nigerian domestic airline, Arik Air, started a scholarship plan in October 2006 for training pilots and aircraft engineers. The first 15 students for the Standard Pilot Course were to graduate in November 2008.

The World Bank tendered for a study on equipment, infrastructure and training needs for the college in November 2008, a preliminary step before allocating funding. As of 2009 although the college undertook initial training of commercial pilots, courses in learning to fly new aircraft types and refresher courses were mostly done outside Nigeria. In January 2010 the president of Aviation Round Table, Captain Dele Ore, called for increased funding for the college so it could meet its statutory obligations.

In March 2014, Captain Samuel Akinyele Caulcrick was appointed rector of the college.

In January 2017, Capt. Abdulsalami Mohammed was appointed the Rector/CE of the College. He assumed office immediately after he was pronounced the new Rector of the College.

Incidents
In July 2008, a trainer jet missed the runway and crashed into the fence. The pilot was injured, and the jet slightly damaged. Another incident occurred in 2005.

See also
 List of polytechnics in Nigeria

External links
NCAT Carrier Portal

References

Aviation schools
Technological universities in Nigeria
Universities and colleges in Kaduna State
Educational institutions established in 1964
1964 establishments in Nigeria
Zaria
Federal universities of Nigeria